Coriscada is a freguesia ("civil parish") of Portugal, in the municipality of Mêda, in Guarda district. The population in 2011 was 208 in an area of 25.19 km2.

Extremely rich in 17th century patrimony, the village has been notable since 2000 for the discovery nearby of a Roman villa, the Vale do Mouro, excavated by a Luso-French team from 2003.

The antipode of Coriscada is the town of Takaka, New Zealand.

References

External links
More details on this village and its activities on the site of Coriscada's Cultural Center (in Portuguese): CSCC

Freguesias of Mêda